Mount Olive Cumberland Presbyterian Church is one of the oldest existing congregations west of the Mississippi River and its historic church building at the junction of Izard County Roads 12 and 18 in Mount Olive, Arkansas is listed with the National Register of Historic Places.  The pastor is Rev. Christopher S. Anderson.

The building was constructed in 1916 largely through donations from the descendants of Jehoiada and Daniel Jeffery. They had founded the church congregation in 1826 as the White River Cumberland Presbyterian Church. The Mount Olive Male and Female Academy thrived nearby. The church building was added to the National Register of Historic Places in 2004.

See also
National Register of Historic Places listings in Izard County, Arkansas

References

External links
Information about history of church

Presbyterian churches in Arkansas
Churches on the National Register of Historic Places in Arkansas
Churches completed in 1916
Churches in Izard County, Arkansas
Wooden churches in Arkansas
Cumberland Presbyterian Church
National Register of Historic Places in Izard County, Arkansas